Djavan Caetano Viana (born 27 January 1949) is a Brazilian singer-songwriter.

Early life and career
Djavan was born in Maceió, Brazil to a white father of Dutch descent and a black mother. He later formed the group Luz, Som, Dimensão (LSD – "Light, Sound, Dimension"), playing Beatles' material. In 1973, Djavan moved to Rio de Janeiro and started singing soap opera soundtracks. His first album, A Voz, o Violão e a Arte de Djavan, was recorded in 1976 and included the hit song "Flor de Lis". Stevie Wonder was a guest on the album Luz.

In 1999, his album Ao Vivo sold 1.2 million copies. In 2016, he was nominated for the 2016 Latin Grammy Awards in the Record of the Year, Album of the Year, Best Portuguese Language Song and Best Singer-Songwriter Album categories. Djavan's compositions have been recorded by numerous musicians, including Al Jarreau, Carmen McRae and The Manhattan Transfer. His album Vesúvio was ranked as the 35th best Brazilian album of 2018 by the Brazilian edition of Rolling Stone magazine.

Discography

Studio albums 
 (1976) A Voz, o Violão, a Música de Djavan
 (1978) Djavan
 (1979) Alumbramento
 (1981) Seduzir
 (1982) Luz
 (1984) Lilás
 (1986) Meu Lado
 (1987) Não É Azul Mas É Mar
 (1988) Bird of Paradise
 (1989) Puzzle of Hearts
 (1992) Coisa de Acender
 (1994) Esquinas
 (1995) Novena
 (1996) Malásia
 (1998) Bicho Solto O XIII
 (2001) Milagreiro
 (2004) Vaidade
 (2005) Na Pista, Etc.
 (2007) Matizes
 (2010) Ária
 (2012) Rua dos Amores
 (2015) Vidas pra Contar
 (2018) Vesúvio
 (2022  D

Live albums 

 (1999) Djavan ao Vivo
 (2011) Ária ao Vivo
 (2014) Rua dos Amores ao Vivo

Video albums 

 (2000) Djavan ao Vivo
 (2002) Milagreiro ao Vivo
 (2011) Ária ao Vivo
 (2014) Rua dos Amores ao Vivo

References

External links
 Djavan's official web site
 A concert review in the Guardian
 Djavan's chords and tabs

1949 births
Living people
Afro-Brazilian male singers
Samba musicians
Brazilian jazz singers
Brazilian people of Dutch descent
Brazilian people of indigenous peoples descent
Columbia Records artists
Música Popular Brasileira singers
Latin dance singers
Latin Grammy Award winners
People from Maceió
Latin Grammy Lifetime Achievement Award winners
Brazilian songwriters
Latin music songwriters
Male jazz musicians